The Ngarluma are an Indigenous Australian people of the western Pilbara area of northwest Australia. They are coastal dwellers of the area around Roebourne and Karratha. Not including Millstream.

Language
The Ngarluma language belongs to the Ngayarda branch of the Pama-Nyungan family. It is a highly inflected suffixing language, with, unusually, a Nominative-Accusative case-marking system, with verbs inflected for Tense, Aspect and Mood. The Ngarluma on contact with whites and distant tribes appeared to have reserved their grammatically complex language for conversations among themselves while adopting a simplified version when interacting with strangers.

There are an estimated 20 full speakers, most are older generation.

History
It would appear that the Ngarluma adapted quickly to the developing pearling industry along the northwest coast, perhaps travelling down to get work at Cossack 300 miles south. This hypothesis is based on the fact that the vocabulary list provided to a priest in 1875 by two Dalmatian Italian shipwreck survivors, Michele Bacich and Giovanni Iurich, after they returned to Italy, appears to be a creole with a strong but simplified component of Ngarluma. It is thought that they were extended hospitality for 3 months by the Yinikutira people who had picked up the creole from indentured Ngarluma labourers in the pearling industry.

Kinship system
The Ngarluma people have a four group skin system.

Some words
 t(h)artaruga = (sea turtle). This might be a loanword predating the Western discovery of the continent of Australia.

In a number of Pilbara languages such as Ngarluma, Ngarla, Kariyarra Yinjibarndi and Nyamal, the turle is called tartaruga/thartaruga. This happens to be identical to the Portuguese word for that creature, and there is a grounded suspicion that the common term must reflect some otherwise unattested interception of Portuguese sailors prior to the advent of the Dutch on the northwestern coast. The data, and theorization of some such contact, was gathered and advanced by Carl Georg von Brandenstein, who hypothesized that there must have been a secret Portuguese colony established in the area around the 1520s, which lasted for 60 years. The need for secrecy stemmed, in this hypothesis, from the consequences of the Treaty of Tordesillas which divided the New World into Spanish and Portuguese imperial zones. Von Brandenstein thought that, given the quarrels between the two nations over the boundaries and extension of these lines of demarcation, the Portuguese might have kept their discovery of Australia and colonization of the coastal area of the Pilbara, secret until the Portuguese succession crisis of 1580 led to the regency of the Spanish king Philip 11, after which the colony ended. This etymology has strong claims, unlike the rest of the hypothesis.

Native title 
In 2015, the Ngarluma people's native title rights were recognised by the Federal Court of Australia. Ngarluma Aboriginal Corporation, based in Karratha, administer the Ngarluma's native title rights and interests.

Since 1998, the Ngarluma people, alongside the Yindjibarndi people, have been a party to the land access agreement for the Woodside-operated North West Shelf Gas Project. Under the agreement, Ngarluma and Yindjibarndi people remain the traditional owner representatives for the North West Shelf Project area, which includes the Karratha Gas Plant.

The 1998 agreement contributed to the establishment of the Ngarluma Yindjibarndi Foundation Ltd (NYFL), which continues to operate out of Roebourne. NYFL delivers social and economic benefits for the Ngarluma and Yindjibarndi people, and the broader Roebourne community.

Notes

Citations

Sources

Aboriginal peoples of Western Australia
Broome, Western Australia